The Saskatoon Slam were a professional basketball franchise based in Saskatoon, Saskatchewan, Canada, that played in the National Basketball League in 1993 and 1994. The teams in the NBL were the Canadian franchises of the World Basketball Association, which folded in 1992. The ownership of the WBL’s Saskatchewan Storm franchise chose to re-name the team as the Saskatoon Slam in the new league. The team played its home games at Saskatchewan Place. In the NBL's single full season, 1993, the Slam captured the league championship. They defeated the Cape Breton Breakers three games to one. All the games were played in Saskatoon to reduce travel costs. The Slam returned for the 1994 season, but the league folded on 9 July that year.

Season by season results
Note: GP = Games played, W = Wins, L = Losses, GBL = Games Behind Leader

All-time roster

References

National Basketball League (Canada) teams
Sport in Saskatoon
Basketball in Saskatchewan
Defunct basketball teams in Canada
Defunct sports teams in Saskatchewan
Basketball teams established in 1993
Sports clubs disestablished in 1994